Party Doll and Other Favorites is the first compilation album by American country music singer Mary Chapin Carpenter. It was released in 1999 on the Columbia Records label and comprises a mix of her greatest hits, several album cuts, and newly recorded tracks.

Content
The collection uses live or special event recordings in place of the studio cuts in several cases, others like "I Feel Lucky" and "He Thinks He'll Keep Her" are the original album versions.  Of the new material, "Almost Home" and "Wherever You Are" were both released as singles, respectively reaching numbers 22 and 55 on the Billboard country charts in 1999. The track "Can't Take Love for Granted" was taken from a live performance on Late Show with David Letterman; the song, originally a ballad appearing on her third album, Shooting Straight in the Dark, differed from the album version, in that it was performed as a rowdy, guitar-driven rock and roll performance.

Some of the songs on this album originally appeared on other sources. "Dreamland" previously appeared on the 1992 compilation Til Their Eyes Shine... The Lullaby Album, "Grow Old with Me" comes from Working Class Hero: A Tribute to John Lennon, and "10,000 Miles" comes from the 1996 film Fly Away Home.

Carpenter produced most of the album with her usual producer, John Jennings, except for "Wherever You Are" and "Almost Home", which she produced with Blake Chancey, and "10,000 Miles", which was produced by Mark Isham.

Track listing
All songs written by Mary Chapin Carpenter, except where noted.
"Can't Take Love for Granted" – 3:47
live recording from the Late Show with David Letterman - May 18, 1995
"Wherever You Are" – 4:16
"Down at the Twist and Shout" – 3:18
live recording from Super Bowl XXXI with BeauSoleil - January 1997
"I Feel Lucky" (Carpenter, Don Schlitz) – 3:31
"Dreamland" – 3:03
"Passionate Kisses" (Lucinda Williams) – 3:21
"Quittin' Time" (Roger Linn, Robb Royer) – 6:10
live recording from the Ryman Auditorium - November 1994
"This Shirt" – 3:47
"Grow Old with Me" (John Lennon) – 3:22
"He Thinks He'll Keep Her" (Carpenter, Schlitz) – 4:02
"I Take My Chances" (Carpenter, Schlitz) – 4:22
live recording at the Barrymore Theatre, Madison, Wisconsin - November 1998
"Shut Up and Kiss Me" – 3:41
"The Hard Way" (Carpenter) – 4:54
from the PBS special In the Spotlight and the DVD/Video Jubilee: Live at Wolftrap
"10,000 Miles" (Traditional) – 6:11
from the film Fly Away Home
"Stones in the Road" – 4:34
live recording from Her Majesty's Theatre, London - December 4, 1994
"Almost Home" (Carpenter, Beth Nielsen Chapman, Annie Roboff) – 4:37
"Party Doll" (Mick Jagger) – 5:39

Charts

Weekly charts

Year-end charts

References

1999 compilation albums
Mary Chapin Carpenter compilation albums
Columbia Records compilation albums